Halmø is a small private uninhabited Danish island in the South Funen Archipelago, lying 4 km northeast of Marstal. The island is 2 km long, and about 350 meters wide.

References 

Danish islands in the Baltic
Islands of Denmark
Geography of Ærø Municipality